Club Deportivo Azkoyen, previously called Club Multideporte Peralta and Club Deportivo Azcoyen, is a Spanish football team based in Peralta, in the autonomous community of Navarre. Founded in 1927, it has participated 24 seasons in Tercera División y 3 seasons in Segunda División B. Nowadays, it plays in Primera Autonómica de Navarra, holding home matches at Campo de Fútbol Las Luchas, with a capacity of 2.500 spectators.

History

Club background
Club Deportivo Azkoyen — (1927–2002)
Club Multideporte Peralta — (2002–07)
Club Deportivo Azkoyen — (2007–)

Season to season

3 seasons in Segunda División B
24 seasons in Tercera División

Famous players
 Leonardo Iglesias
 Aitor Goñi
 Pedro Gurpegi
 Rafa Jordà
 Javier Lezaun
 Nagore
 Alejandro Nicolay

External links
Futbolme.com profile 
navarrafutbolclic.com profile 

Football clubs in Navarre
Association football clubs established in 1927
Divisiones Regionales de Fútbol clubs
1927 establishments in Spain